Metra Theatre is an east London based theatre company established in August 2005.  The company specialises in taking on what they perceive to be 'dormant' texts and bringing them to life, making them accessible to modern theatre audiences. They strive to keep admission costs to their productions low to draw in audiences who would not normally go to the theatre.

Metra Theatre consists of artistic director Tanya Roberts, Jessica Stanley, Josephine Rogers, and Lee-Diep Chu.

Measure for Measure
Nine graduating students, fresh from London Metropolitan University were chosen to perform William Shakespeare's Measure for Measure at the International Shakespeare festival in Gdańsk, Poland as part of the education program. the performance was directed by lecturers Gian Carlo Rossi and Lucy Richardson with vocal coach acek Ludwig Scarso.  As was to become a staple factor in Metra's work, the development of the production drew heavily from the ideas of philosopher Gilles Deleuze.  Deleuze refers to ideas as being rhizome, meaning a thick underground stem or root system. It stretches out, reaching into all dimensions, rebelling against its own foundations and outgrowing beginnings and endings.

Although the production was a modern reworking, it used Shakespeare's original language and attempted to present it in a way that resonates today, not by replacing and resetting it in a parallel era or context, but by drawing on many different ideas, concepts, styles, techniques and quirks, and bring them together to form a unique, explorative and un-unified piece of theatre.  Metra Theatre later described it as tackling Measure for Measure ‘with feminist foresight, socio-religious thinking and a bit of jive to boot’.

In early 2006, Metra Theatre showcased a new version of the performance - including an Aerial Dance performed by Francesca Hyde - at The Lion and Unicorn pub theatre in Kentish Town, London.  The production was popular and received a glowing review from Wendy Attwell (of The Shakespeare Revue).  The response to this production contributed heavily to Metra's passion in making theatre more accessible, and drawing in new audiences who wouldn't necessarily go to see a classical play for fear of 'not getting it'.

Simon McPhillips with Lucky Strike Productions and Press On Features went on to use an adapted version of the script in a film version of play.  The film was set in a modern-day army base, with Josephine Rogers continuing on with her role as Isabella.

Lysistrata
Metra Theatre performed their second production, a modern take on Aristophanes' Lysistrata (using the Dudley Fitts' translation) in July 2006, their first production developed without the guidance of their lecturers.  Continuing on with the Deleuzian theory that Measure for Measure was rooted in, they intuitively jetted through a range of different sources and concepts which have a root in the context of the play, without feeling any pressure to be part of unified theme or universal conclusion.  Metra utilised the Essentialist Feminism that is present in the text, drawing on music and dance from the 1920s, evoking a time when women were slowly but firmly rejecting the image of the submissive, dependent housewife. Lysistrata was performed at the Brickhouse on Brick Lane in East London.  The production continued Metra's use of different disciplines by incorporating static trapeze and the 1920s Charleston style of dance.

The Revenger's Tragedy
Metra Theatre's third production was a take on Thomas Middleton's The Revenger's Tragedy, directed by Tanya Roberts and performed as part of the Enterprise 08 Festival at the Space Theatre in Isle of Dogs.

3 Sisters
Metra Theatre's fourth production was an adaptation of Anton Chekhov's Three Sisters performed on a moving canal barge.  The first run took place in November, 2008 along the Regent's Canal in Camden. Over the next three years, Metra Theatre embarked on a sell-out national tour of '3 Sisters', performing in Bath (Bath Fringe Festival), Cardiff (Wales Millennium Centre), Edinburgh Fringe Festival, The Secret Garden Party, Manchester, The Lowry, Oxford. Oxford Playhouse, until finally returning the show to London.

Shakin' the Blues Away
Metra Theatre's latest production explores the lives of Katharine Hepburn, Rita Hayworth, and Ann Miller. Set to tour in late 2014.

References

External links
Official company website
 Wendy Attwell's review of Measure for Measure
Ukscreen profile
Teatrum Gedanese Foundation
 The Space
 Maddy Ryle's review of The Revenger's Tragedy
Skye Crawford's review of 3 Sisters
Article in the Independent by Alice Jones
Review of 3 Sisters by BroadwayBaby.com
Interview with the director and cast of 3 Sisters from EdFest TV
Review of 3 Sisters by TimeOut
Review of 3 Sisters by the Herald
Review of 3 Sisters by Three Weeks

Theatre companies in London